This is a list of video games for the Game Boy and Game Boy Color video game consoles that have sold or shipped at least one million copies, including games whose sales figures were published, and games which received the Player's Choice label for selling a million units. The best-selling game on the Game Boy and Game Boy Color is Pokémon Red/Green/Blue/Yellow, which released in 1996 and sold over  units worldwide. The second best-selling title is Tetris; first released in Japan on June 14, 1989, Tetris was often bundled with the original Game Boy and went on to sell in excess of 35million units worldwide. It is followed by the best-selling Game Boy Color game, Pokémon Gold/Silver/Crystal, which sold over  units in total. The top five is rounded out by the platform's first Super Mario game, Super Mario Land, which sold over 18million units worldwide, and Dr. Mario with over  units sold.

There are a total of 67 Game Boy and Game Boy Color games on the list which are confirmed to have sold or shipped at least one million units. Of these, 20 were developed by internal Nintendo development divisions. Other developers with the most million-selling games include Capcom with seven games, as well as Game Freak, Rare, and Tose with five games each in the list of 67. Of the 67 games on this list, 48 were published in one or more regions by Nintendo. Other publishers with multiple million-selling games include Konami with three games and Bandai and Enix with two games each. The most popular franchises on Game Boy and Game Boy Color include Pokémon (84.54million combined units), Tetris (38.12million combined units), Super Mario (34.39million combined units), Donkey Kong (12.55million combined units), and Kirby (10.91million combined units).

List

Notes

References

External links
 Nintendo official website

Game Boy
Best-selling Game Boy and Game Boy Color video games